BioEssays is a monthly peer-reviewed review journal covering molecular and cellular biology. Areas covered include genetics, genomics, epigenetics, evolution, developmental biology, neuroscience, human biology, physiology, systems biology, and plant biology. The journal also publishes commentaries on aspects of science communication, education, policy, and current affairs.

History 
The journal was established in December 1984 by founding editor-in-chief William J. Whelan under the auspices of the International Union of Biochemistry and Molecular Biology. Adam S. Wilkins became editor in January 1990. Originally published by ICSU Press and The Company of Biologists, BioEssays has been published by John Wiley & Sons since January 1998. Andrew Moore became editor-in-chief in August 2008. Kerstin Brachhold is current editor-in-chief.

Post-publication commenting 
BioEssays offers an article-commenting facility via its website. Topics of particular current attention are often highlighted for commenting.

Abstracting and indexing
The journal is abstracted and indexed in:

According to the Journal Citation Reports, the journal has a 2012 impact factor of 5.423.

References

External links 
 

Biology journals
Publications established in 1984
Wiley (publisher) academic journals
Monthly journals
English-language journals